Carlos Roqueiro (born 23 October 1944) is an Argentine former cyclist. He competed in the sprint event at the 1968 Summer Olympics.

References

External links
 

1944 births
Living people
Argentine male cyclists
Olympic cyclists of Argentina
Cyclists at the 1968 Summer Olympics
Cyclists from Buenos Aires